Ashok Masti is an Indian Playback singer. He is best known for his song "Khadke Glassy" which is sung by him and Yo Yo Honey Singh from the movie Jabriya Jodi starring Parineeti Chopra & Siddharth Malhotra.
His song "Glassy-2" has been nominated for the Best Punjabi Music Club Song of the year Award. Ashok Masti is popularly known as Human Dynamo.

Early life 
Masti hails from Gidderbaha in Sri Muktsar Sahib district, Punjab.

Career 
He started his career singing on small stages in small towns, then he started doing theatre as well. He was in Chandigarh for a long time regarding theatre. He then started doing concerts for the north cultural zone. Around the same time, he started doing concerts for Punjabi Academy, New Delhi. From Chandigarh he started waving the audience in New Delhi, which made him settle in New Delhi.
Performing in numerous concerts in India and abroad, Masti has created a niche for himself in the world of music. One of his songs, Khadke Glassy, which also featured in the 2019 Bollywood movie Jabariya Jodi, became a mega blockbuster globally.
In April 2020, Masti released a song "Hausla Na Chhadin" which featured 31 artists alongside him including Mika Singh, Daler Mehndi, Jasbir Jassi and Gurpreet Guggi, who came together on one platform to help motivate the nation in the time of the COVID-19 pandemic.

References

External links
 

21st-century Indian male singers
21st-century Indian singers
Punjabi-language singers
Living people
Punjabi music
Singers from Punjab, India
People from Jalandhar district
Year of birth missing (living people)
Bollywood playback singers
Indian male playback singers